Nancy Henderson Ryan (1936–2017) was an American writer of romance novels under her full name and as Nan Ryan.

Biography
Nancy Henderson was born in Texas, the middle daughter of a rancher and postmaster.

In 1981, after reading an article on romance writers, "From bedroom to boardroom", she began to write with her Smith Corona.

Nan married Joe Ryan, a television director. They lived in Washington, California, New Mexico, Colorado, Arizona, Missouri, Alabama, Georgia, Florida, and her native Texas.

Nan Ryan won Historical Storyteller of the year in 1995 from Romantic Times.  She was nominated for Best Western Historical romance in 1997.  Ryan was named Best historical storyteller of the year in again in 2001.

Ryan was nominated for the Romantic Times Reviewers' Choice Award in 2003 for Best Western Romance for her novel Naughty Marietta.

Nan Ryan died on March 14, 2017, in Bryson, Texas.

Bibliography

As Nancy Henderson Ryan

Single Novel
Kathleen's surrender,	1983/Jan

As Nan Ryan

Single Novels
Lightning strikes twice,	1987/May
Wayward Lady,	1987/May
Desert storm,	1987/Jun
Love in the air,	1987/Sep
Midnight affair,	1988/Jul
Stardust,	1988/Oct
Savage heat,	1989/Jan
Silken bondage,	1989/Jan
Outlaw's kiss,	1989/Fev
Sun god,	1990/Sep
Cloudcastle,	1990/Oct
The legend of the love,	1991/Sep
Written in the starts,	1992
Love me tonight,	1994
A life time of heaven,	1994/Fev
Because you're mine,	1995/Aug
You belong to my heart,	1996/Fev
Burning love,	1996/Sep
The princess goes west,	1998/Jul
Waning you,	1999/Jul
The countess misbehaves,	2000/Jun
The seducction of Ellen,	2001/Apr
The scandalous Miss Howard,	2002/Apr
Naughty Marietta,	2003/Apr
The last dance,	2003/Dec
Chieftain,	2004/Mar
Duchess for a day,	2005/Jun
The sheriff,	2006/Apr
Dearest enemy,	2006/Nov
"Kathleen's Surrender"  2012/Oct E book Open Road Media
"Desert Storm" 2012/Oct E book Open Road Media
"Savage Heat" 2012/Oct E book open road media
"Burning Love" 2012/Oct E book Open Road Media 
"Desert Storm" 2012/Oct E book Open Road Media
"Outlaw's Kiss" 2012/Oct E book Open Road Media
"Burning Love"2012/Oct E  book Open Road Media

References
 Open Road Integrated Media Home Page lists above books and pub dates.

Sources
Nan Ryan at Fantastic Fiction

20th-century American novelists
21st-century American novelists
American romantic fiction writers
American women novelists
20th-century American women writers
21st-century American women writers
2017 deaths
1936 births